Maryland Route 216 (MD 216) is a state highway in the U.S. state of Maryland. Known for most of its length as Scaggsville Road, the highway runs  from MD 108 at Highland east to MD 198 in Laurel. MD 216 connects Highland, Fulton, Scaggsville, and North Laurel in southern Howard County with Laurel in far northern Prince George's County. The highway connects those communities with Interstate 95 (I-95) and U.S. Route 29 (US 29).

MD 216 was constructed from Laurel to Fulton in the mid-1920s and extended to Highland in the late 1930s. The highway was constructed through Laurel toward Fort Meade in Anne Arundel County in the mid-1930s. MD 216 was truncated at US 1 in Laurel after MD 198 was constructed from Laurel to Fort Meade in the mid-1940s. The highway's eastern terminus was moved from US 1 to MD 198 and relocated in North Laurel in the early 1960s. Another segment of MD 216 was relocated when I-95 was built in the early 1970s, resulting in a disjoint route. The route was unified when the highway was relocated west through its interchange with US 29 in the mid-2000s.

Route description

MD 216 begins at an intersection with MD 108 (Clarksville Pike) in Highland in Howard County. The road continues west as county-maintained Highland Road. MD 216 heads southeast as two-lane undivided Scaggsville Road, which veers east in the village of Fulton and passes south of Reservoir High School. The highway expands to a four-lane divided highway that passes through four roundabouts and heads north of a park and ride lot serving MTA Maryland commuter buses on its approach to its four-ramp partial cloverleaf interchange with US 29 (Columbia Pike) in Scaggsville. The first roundabout is with Old Columbia Pike and provides access to the park and ride lot; the second is with Maple Lawn Boulevard, which serves the Maple Lawn community to the north. The next two roundabouts are with the ramps to and from US 29 and with MD 216J and Ice Crystal Drive, respectively, on either side of the U.S. Highway. MD 216 continues southeast through intersections with Crest Road and Leishear Road and passes south of an electric substation before its cloverleaf interchange with I-95.

East of I-95, MD 216 has a partial interchange with Stephens Road. There is no access from Stephens Road to eastbound MD 216; that movement is made at the next intersection with All Saints Road, where the highway reduces to a two-lane undivided road. The highway expands to a four-lane divided highway again just north of Baltimore Avenue and Pilgrim Avenue and crosses over the Patuxent River into the city of Laurel in Prince George's County, where it continues as 7th Street. At its intersection with Main Street, MD 216 drops to two lanes and becomes municipally maintained. The highway passes east of the original site of Laurel High School at Montgomery Street and east of the Laurel Branch Library at Talbott Avenue, which is the westbound portion of the one-way pair that carries MD 198 through the city. MD 216 continues two blocks to its eastern terminus at eastbound MD 198 (Gorman Avenue).

History
The first segment of MD 216 was built as a gravel road from Main Street in Laurel to Scaggsville in 1923. The highway was extended to Fulton in 1925. Main Street in Laurel was paved in macadam with concrete shoulders between 1930 and 1933. Starting in 1934, MD 216 was extended east from US 1 to Fort Meade using the existing county bridge across the Patuxent River, which was repaired as part of the project. The extension to Fort Meade was completed by 1938. MD 216 was extended west from Fulton to US 29 (now MD 108) at Highland in 1938 and 1939. Starting in 1942, MD 602 was built along the present alignment of MD 198 from US 1 to Fort Meade as a military access project. The first segment of the new highway, from US 1 to MD 216 near Brock Bridge Road in what is now Maryland City, was completed by 1944. The remainder of MD 602 from near Brock Bridge Road to the entrance to Fort Meade near the Little Patuxent River was completed by 1946. When MD 602 was completed, MD 216 was truncated at US 1.

At its maximum extent in 1942, MD 216 mostly followed its present alignment from Highland to Scaggsville. The highway continued along what is now Old Scaggsville Road, which is now broken into two parts by the I-95 interchange. MD 216 crossed the Patuxent River in line with 9th Street in Laurel on a bridge that no longer exists. The highway turned east onto Main Street, which it followed through its intersection with US 1. MD 216 passed under the Baltimore and Ohio Railroad (now CSX's Capital Subdivision) and curved east to cross the Patuxent River on another defunct bridge. The highway passed along the edge of Laurel Park Racecourse and intersected Brock Bridge Road near the latter road's modern intersection with MD 198. MD 216 continued along a path generally to the north of what is now MD 198; several pieces of the old highway remain in Maryland City and on the east side of the Baltimore–Washington Parkway. The state highway's eastern end was at the entrance to Fort Meade near the Little Patuxent River.

MD 216 was paved from Highland to Laurel in 1956. The highway's present bridge across the Patuxent River was built in 1960. The following year, MD 216 was removed from Main Street and placed on 7th Street from the river to MD 198, which then followed Montgomery Avenue. By 1963, the state highway was moved to its present course from north of the Patuxent River to Scaggsville Road near the site of the I-95 interchange. Old Scaggsville Road was later designated MD 983. Also in 1963, MD 198 was moved from Montgomery Avenue to its present one-way pair through Laurel and MD 216 was extended along 7th Street to its present terminus. The highway's interchange with I-95 was constructed in 1970 and 1971. Between then and 1978, MD 216 was extended west from the I-95 interchange along a new course to Leishear Road, bypassing another part of Scaggsville Road. That segment of Old Scaggsville Road became MD 983A. The portion of Leishear Road connecting the two segments of MD 216 remained county maintained.

Work on improving MD 216's intersection with US 29 was underway by 1997, when the state highway was expanded to a divided highway on either side of the intersection. The US 29–MD 216 interchange, including the pair of roundabouts, was completed in 2001. The three-legged roundabout at Old Columbia Pike was added in 2002; the one at Maple Lawn Boulevard was completed in 2004. The MD 216 divided highway between the US 29 interchange and east of Leishear Road was under construction by 2004 and completed in 2005. The western end of the two-lane segment of highway from the US 29 interchange to Leishear Road was changed to a cul-de-sac. MD 216's partial interchange with Stephens Road was under construction by 2003 and completed in 2005.

Junction list

Auxiliary routes
MD 216 has five existing auxiliary routes and five former auxiliary routes. MD 216A, MD 216B, and MD 216I and former MD 216C were designated between Maryland City and Fort Meade. The remaining routes are or were in Scaggsville.

See also

References

External links

MDRoads: MD 216

216
Maryland Route 216
Maryland Route 216